The Victorian Society is a UK amenity society and membership organisation that campaigns to preserve and promote interest in Victorian and Edwardian architecture and heritage built between 1837 and 1914 in England and Wales. It is a registered charity.

Goals 

The Society, a registered charity, fights to protect Victorian and Edwardian heritage from demolition or careless alteration. As a membership organisation, the majority of its funding comes from subscription fees and events. As one of the National Amenity Societies, The Victorian Society is a statutory consultee on alterations to listed buildings, and by law must be notified of any work to a listed building which involves any element of demolition.

The society:

 Provides advice to churches and local planning authorities on how Victorian and Edwardian buildings and landscapes can be adapted to modern use, while keeping what is distinctive about them.
 Advises members of the public on how they can help shape the future of their local Victorian and Edwardian buildings and landscapes.
 Provides information to owners of Victorian and Edwardian houses about how they can better look after their buildings.
 Helps people understand, appreciate and enjoy the architectural heritage of the Victorian and Edwardian period through its publications and events.

History

Foundation 

The society's foundation was proposed in November 1957 by Anne Parsons, Countess of Rosse at her remarkably-preserved Victorian home at 18 Stafford Terrace, Kensington (Linley Sambourne House), with the intention of countering the widely prevalent antipathy to 19th- and early 20th-century architecture. From the 1890s into the 20th century, Victorian art had been under attack, critics writing of "the nineteenth century architectural tragedy", ridiculing "the uncompromising ugliness" of the era's buildings and attacking the "sadistic hatred of beauty" of its architects. The commonly-held view had been expressed by P.G. Wodehouse in his 1933 novel, Summer Moonshine: "Whatever may be said in favour of the Victorians, it is pretty generally admitted that few of them were to be trusted within reach of a trowel and a pile of bricks."

The first meeting was held at Linley Sambourne House on 28 February 1958. Among its thirty founder members were the first secretary John Betjeman, Henry-Russell Hitchcock and Nikolaus Pevsner, who became Chairman in 1964.

Directors 
Peter Fleetwood-Hesketh was secretary from 1961 to 1963. Former Bletchley Park codebreaker, Jane Fawcett, managed the society's affairs as secretary from 1964 to 1976. Christopher Costelloe took over as Director from Dr Ian Dungavell  in 2012. Joe O'Donnell succeeded Christopher Costelloe as Director in September 2020.

Work 

The society has worked to save numerous landmark buildings such as St Pancras Station, Albert Dock in Liverpool, the Foreign Office and Oxford University Museum. Its campaigns have not always been successful, notably its failed attempts to save the Euston Arch from demolition in 1961.

Examples of the society's work with churches include making complaints against proposals of church PCCs to use upholstered chairs during renovation, and appealing against proposals to raise money by selling original features.

In 2015 the society launched a campaign to preserve Victorian gasometers, after utility companies announced plans to demolish nearly 200 of the now-outdated structures. Christopher Costelloe, the society's director, commented: "Gasometers, by their very size and structure, cannot help but become landmarks. [They] are singularly dramatic structures for all their emptiness."

The society publishes an annual list of the Top Ten Most Endangered Victorian or Edwardian Buildings in England and Wales.

The Victorian magazine 

Published three times a year since 1998 for the members of the Society, The Victorian magazine contains book reviews, society news and events, casework reports, and interviews.

Victorian Society in America
The Victorian Society has a sister organisation in the United States, the Victorian Society in America, founded in 1966 in New York City, by such champions of historic preservation as Brendan Gill, Henry-Russell Hitchcock, and Margot Gayle; it was borne from the outrage they felt at the 1964 destruction of New York's magnificent Pennsylvania Station.  the Victorian Society in America is based in Philadelphia with 12 registered chapters, mostly in the Eastern United States.

Counterpart bodies
The counterpart organisations to the society for the protection of the heritage of earlier and later periods are the Georgian Group (for buildings erected between 1700 and 1840) and The Twentieth Century Society (for post-1914 buildings).

See also
 British industrial architecture
 British Queen Anne Revival architecture
 Gothic Revival architecture
 Victorian house

Footnotes

References

Sources

External links 

Organizations established in 1958
Architecture organisations based in the United Kingdom
Cultural heritage of the United Kingdom
Heritage organisations in the United Kingdom
Historical societies of the United Kingdom
Victorian Society
1958 establishments in the United Kingdom